The 2012–13 Maritime Junior Hockey League season was the 46th season in league history. The season consisted of 52 games played by each MHL team.

Upon completion of the regular season, the top qualifying teams will play down for the Kent Cup, the league's playoff championship trophy.  The Kent Cup champion will then meet the top teams of the Quebec Junior AAA Hockey League and Central Canada Hockey League in a host city to determine the Eastern Canadian Fred Page Cup champion.

The Summerside Western Capitals won the 2013 Kent Cup by losing only 1 game throughout the entire MHL playoffs.

The Fred Page Cup was hosted and won by the Truro Bearcats in 2013 with the Summerside Western Capitals the runners-up. The 2013 RBC cup Was hosted by the Summerside Western Capitals they finished 2nd while Truro finished 5th.

Team Changes  
The Metro Marauders were renamed the Metro Shipbuliders.

Regular season standings
'''Final standings

Note: GP = Games played; W = Wins; L = Losses; OTL = Overtime losses; SL = Shootout losses; GF = Goals for; GA = Goals against; PTS = Points; X - Clinched Playoff spot; Y - Clinched Division; Z- Clinched first overall

2013 MHL Playoff bracket

Eastlink Division Mini series
 * = If Necessary

(4) Pictou County Crushers  Vs. (5) Bridgewater Lumberjacks

Round one

(1) Meek Semi-final 1 Summerside Western Capitals  Vs. (4) Miramichi Timberwolves

Meek Semi-final 2 (2) Woodstock Slammers  vs. (3) Dieppe Commandos

Eastlink Semi-finals 1 (1)Truro Bearcats  vs. (4) Pictou County Crushers

Eastlink Semi-finals 2 (2) Yarmouth Mariners  vs. (3) Amherst Ramblers

Round two

Meek Final(1) Summerside Western Capitals  Vs. (2) Woodstock Slammers

Eastlink Final (1) Truro Bearcats  vs. (3) Amherst Ramblers

Kent Cup Finals

Kent Cup final (1) Summerside Western Capitals   vs. (2) Truro Bearcats

External links 
 Official website of the Maritime Junior Hockey League
 Official website of the Canadian Junior Hockey League

2012
Mar